Supe District is one of five districts of the province Barranca in Peru. In Supe there is an archeological "huaca" called Caral.

References